Bagni (Italian for "baths") may refer to:

Places
 Bagni, a frazione in Contursi Terme, Salerno, Italy
 Bagni, a frazione in Nocera Umbra, Perugia, Italy
 Bagni di Craveggia, a frazione in Craveggia, Verbano-Cusio-Ossola, Italy
 Bagni di Lucca, a comune in Lucca, Italy
 Bagni di Lusnizza, a frazione in Malborghetto Valbruna, Udine, Italy
 Bagni di Montecatini, a frazione in Montecatini Terme, Pistoia, Italy
 Agnone Bagni, a frazione in Augusta, Sicily, Syracuse, Italy
 Bagni San Filippo, a frazione in Castiglione d'Orcia, Siena, Italy
 Canicattini Bagni, a comune in Siracusa, Italy
 Lesignano de' Bagni, a comune in Parma, Italy
 Monticchio Bagni, a frazione in Rionero in Vulture, Potenza, Italy
 San Casciano dei Bagni, a comune in Siena, Italy
 Sclafani Bagni, a comune in Palermo, Italy

Other
 Bagni (surname)